Diary of a Bad Year is a book by South African-born Nobel laureate J. M. Coetzee. It was released by Text Publishing in Australia on 3 September 2007, in the United Kingdom by Harvill Secker (an imprint of Random House) on 6 September, and in the United States on 27 December.

Plot summary 
The protagonist, called Señor C. by the other characters, is an aging South African writer living in Sydney. The novel consists of his essays and musings alongside diary entries by both Señor C. and Anya, a neighbor whom he has hired as a typist. The essays, which take up the larger part of each page, are on wide-ranging topics, including the politics of George W. Bush, Tony Blair, Guantánamo Bay, and terrorism. The diary entries appear beneath the essays and describe the relationship that develops between the two characters, a relationship that ultimately leads to subtle evolutions in both their worldviews.

Awards and nominations 
New South Wales Premier's Literary Awards, Christina Stead Prize for Fiction, 2008: shortlisted 
The Age Book of the Year Award, Fiction Prize, 2008: shortlisted 
Victorian Premier's Literary Award, The Vance Palmer Prize for Fiction, 2008: shortlisted 
Queensland Premier's Literary Awards, Best Fiction Book, 2008: shortlisted 
Australia-Asia Literary Award, 2008: longlisted

Extracts
Extract from The New York Review of Books
Extract from The Guardian

Reviews

References

External links 
Diary of a Bad Year at booksatrandom

2007 novels
Novels by J. M. Coetzee
Novels set in Sydney
Novels about writers
Text Publishing books
Fictional diaries
21st-century South African novels